Temple Beth El was an Orthodox Jewish synagogue formed in 1965 in Syracuse, New York. It originally belonged to the Orthodox Union, then about 1997 it joined the Union for Traditional Judaism. Later, in 2002, it changed to a Conservative affiliation, and held its final service on January 27, 2007.

Arson attack 
The Temple building, but not the sanctuary, was heavily damaged in an arson attack on October 13, 2000. Palestinian-American Ramsi Uthman was convicted in the attack. Uthman, who was born in Venezuela to Palestinian parents, is a naturalized U.S. citizen. Ahed Shehadeh was convicted of aiding and abetting the arson. According to Shehadeh's testimony, after Uthman set fire to the Temple, he yelled "I did this for you, God!"

In exchange for his testimony Shehadeh received a five-year prison sentence, and was released in 2008. Uthman received the maximum possible sentence of 25 years, to be served in New York's Attica Correctional Facility, although he will be eligible for parole in 2021.  He was convicted of a hate crime.

The building reopened in 2001 after repairing some $700,000 of damage from the attack.

Closure and sale 
In 2007, due to declining membership, the synagogue has closed and was sold. The membership voted to join Congregation Beth Sholom-Chevra Shas, a Conservative synagogue at 18 Patsy Lane in DeWitt. In October 2007, the Slavic Full Gospel Church began using the building.

References

Terrorist incidents in the United States in 2000
21st-century attacks on synagogues and Jewish communal organizations in the United States
Islam and antisemitism
Religious buildings and structures in Syracuse, New York
Former synagogues in New York (state)
Orthodox synagogues in New York (state)
Conservative synagogues in New York (state)
Religious buildings and structures in the United States destroyed by arson
Arson in New York (state)
Union for Traditional Judaism